Cartwheels is the second studio album by British modern country-pop music duo Ward Thomas. It was released on 2 September 2016 by Sony Music/WTW Music. The album includes the singles "Carry You Home", "Guilty Flowers", and the title track "Cartwheels". It became the first album by a UK country act to reach number one on the UK Albums Chart suppassing the previous record by The Shires. It has since gone silver in the UK. The album was produced by Martin Terefe and Jimmy Hogarth. They have performed on BBC's The One Show, Children In Need Rocks For Terry Wogan and Sunday Brunch to promote the album.

Singles
"Carry You Home" was released as the lead single from the album on 10 June 2016. "Guilty Flowers" was released as the second single from the album on 29 July 2016 and was added to BBC Radio 2's playlist.

"Cartwheels" was chosen as the album's third single, released on 28 October 2016 as a download bundle with a cover of the Lenny Kravitz track, "Fly Away". In December 2016, Ward Thomas announced during a show at London's Roundhouse that the fourth single release would be "Boomerang". Ward Thomas announced their fifth single as "Material", which was promoted via an interactive video in which the user controls who they watch and hear throughout.

Track listing

Charts

Certifications

Release history

References

External links
 Official website

2016 albums
Ward Thomas (band) albums